The diwans of Cochin assisted the rulers of the Kingdom of Cochin in administering the state. From the 19th century onwards, the diwan or Prime Minister was an administrator selected by the Raja with the advice of the Government of India. Usually, the diwan was a high-ranking official of the Indian Civil Service, covenanted as well as uncovenanted. In Cochin and Travancore, the diwan was also known as Dalavoy.

The following is a list of diwans of Cochin.

 1809–1812 Kunhikrishna Menon
 1812–1818 John Munro
 1818–1825 Nanjappayya
 1825–1830 Seshagiri Rao
 1830–1834 Edamana Sankara Menon
 1834–1840 Venkitasubbaraya
 1840–1856 T. Sankara Warrier
 1856–1860 Venkata Rayar
 1860–1879 T. Sankunni Menon
 1879–1890 T. Govindan Menon
 1890–1893 - C. Thiruvenkatacharya.
 1893–1896 V.S Pillai
 1899–1901 P. Rajagopalachari
 1902–1907 N. Pattabhirama Rao
 1907–1914 A. R. Banerjee
 1914–1919 J. W. Bhore
 1919–1922 T. Vijayaraghavacharya
 1922–1925 P. Narayana Menon
 1925–1930 P. S. Narayana Iyer
 1930–1935 C. G. Herbert
 1935–1941 R. K. Shanmukham Chetty
 1941–1943 A. F. W. Dixon C.I.E., I.C.S.
 1943–1944 G. T. Boag
 1944–1947 C. P. Karunakara Menon